Dimocarpus dentatus is a species of tree related to the Longan. Its distribution ranges from southeast Asia to western New Guinea.

References 

dentatus